Back to nature or return to nature is a philosophy or style of living which emphasises closeness to nature, rather than artifice and civilisation.  In this, the rustic customs and pastoralism of country life are preferred to urban fashion and sophistication.  A famous example is Henry David Thoreau who spent two years living a simple life in a log cabin at Walden Pond.

Notable exponents 

 John Zerzan
 Ted Kaczynski
 Henry David Thoreau

See also 
Rewilding (conservation biology)
Anarcho-primitivism
Back-to-the-land movement
Solarpunk
Cottagecore

References

Nature
Philosophy of life
Simple living